Amy is a 1997 Australian film written by David Parker and directed by Nadia Tass, starring Alana De Roma in the title role, Rachel Griffiths, Ben Mendelsohn, and Nick Barker.

Background
The story developed from a concept inspired by the Man of La Mancha and the screenplay was developed by Tass' husband David Parker. The project that took eleven years to complete due to financial problems and a difficult search for the perfect "Amy".

Plot
Amy's (Alana De Roma) father, Will Enker (Nick Barker), was a popular rock musician accidentally electrocuted while performing on stage. The psychological trauma leaves Amy mute and deaf. At the age of eight she is brought by her mother, Tanya (Rachel Griffiths), to Melbourne to diagnose the reasons for her continued silence. Amy befriends her neighbor, Robert (Ben Mendelsohn), and while social workers try desperately to get her to speak and go to school, she makes the choice to communicate again and begins to sing along to Robert's rock songs after three years of silence. Her mother works out her own emotional issues with the help of a therapist.

Cast

Partial additional cast

Release
The film first screened at the Athens International Film Festival on 12 September 1997, and had its Australian premiere 27 August 1998. It was screened at multiple film festivals from 1998 through 2003, before its television debut in Italy on 14 October 2004.

Reception
When it was released, Amy received rave reviews and many awards and nominations. The film also received criticism as it was sometimes felt to be dated and imprecise in its references to Amy's plight. In France and the U.S, the film was a hit, apparently receiving standing ovations at some theatres. 

The film received approval from Lawrence van Gelder of The New York Times when he offered that "A couple of good performances, linked to a crowd-pleasing but predictable story marred by some slapdash construction await audiences..." and "Warm of heart, modest in polish, 'Amy' provides satisfactions that must be balanced against its flaws." 

The Seattle Post-Intelligencer was less forgiving when they opined that "although the film is a decidedly mixed bag, it's blessed by solid performances from a top-notch cast", that it "feels dated and imprecise", and is "not able to make up its mind whether it wants to be slapstick or a heart-wrenching drama."

On Rotten Tomatoes, the film has an approval rating of 43%, based on reviews from 14 critics. On Metacritic, the film has a score of 40 out of 100, based on reviews from 8 critics, indicating "mixed or average reviews".

Box office
Amy took $599,724 at the box office in Australia, which is equivalent to $883,616 in 2009 dollars.

Awards and nominations
The film won the Prix de la Jeunesse at the 1999 Cannes International Film Festival, and also won the Le Prix Cinecole, an award judged by teachers from across France, which award was presented by the French Minister for Education and Culture. It was announced that Amy would be included in the senior high school curriculum in France.

 1998, Asia-Pacific Film Festival
 Grand Jury Award for outstanding contribution to humanity, Nadia Tass
 People's Choice Awards
 Favourite Australian Movie
 1998, Heartland Film Festival
 Crystal Heart Award, Nadia Tass & David Parker
 1998, Australian Film Institute
 AFI Award nomination for Best Original Screenplay, David Parker
 1998, Brisbane International Film Festival
 Most Popular Film audience selection
 1998, Australian Cinematographers Society
 Gold (shared) for Feature Productions Section, David Parker
 1998, Australian Film Institute
 AFI Award nomination for Best Performance by an Actress in a Leading Role, Rachel Griffiths
 1999, Cannes International Film Festival
 Prix de la Jeunesse, Nadia Tass
 Le Prix Cinecole, Nadia Tass
 1999, Creteil Festival de Femmes
 Prix de Jeunesse
 Prix du Jury Graine de Cinephage
 1999, Giffoni Film Festival
 Bronze Gryphon for Best Actress, Alana De Roma
 Golden Gryphon, Nadia Tass
 1999, Oulu International Children's Film Festival nomination for Starboy Award, Nadia Tass
 Laon International Film Festival For Young People
 Best Film
 Prix du Jury International Jeune Public
 1999, Australian Cinematographers Society
 Award of Distinction for Feature Productions Cinema, David Parker
 Nominated for Featured Productions Cinema
 1999, Young Artist Awards
 nomination for Young Artist Award for Best Performance in a Feature Film - Young Actress Age Ten or Under, Alana De Roma
 2000, Carrousel international du film de Rimouski
 Audience Camério, Nadia Tass
 Camerio Best Feature
 Camerio Grand Public
 Camerio Best Actress, Alana de Roma
 Camerio Best Actor, Ben Mendelsohn
 2000, Paris Film Festival
 Public Prize, Nadia Tass

Reviews

 Variety: Amy review by David Rooney
 eFilmCritic: Amy (2001) review by Jimmie Reardon
 Haro-Online: Amy review
 Steve Baker's Film Review: review

See also
 Cinema of Australia

References

External links
 
 
 Amy at Oz Movies

1997 films
Australian drama films
Films about deaf people
Films directed by Nadia Tass
Films set in Melbourne
Films shot in Melbourne
1990s English-language films